In Greek mythology, Phorbus (Ancient Greek: Φόρβος Phórbos) father of Pronoe, wife of Aetolus, the founder of Aetolia. Through his daughter, he was grandfather of Pleuron and Calydon, and thus, the ancestor of the Calydonian royal family with notable members including: Oeneus, Althaea, Leda, Deianira and Melager.

Genealogical tree

Note

Reference 

 Apollodorus, The Library with an English Translation by Sir James George Frazer, F.B.A., F.R.S. in 2 Volumes, Cambridge, MA, Harvard University Press; London, William Heinemann Ltd. 1921. ISBN 0-674-99135-4. Online version at the Perseus Digital Library. Greek text available from the same website.

Characters in Greek mythology